Jonathan Peacock MBE (born 28 May 1993) is an English sprint runner. An amputee, Peacock won gold at the 2012 Summer Paralympics and 2016 Summer Paralympics, representing Great Britain in the T44 men's 100 metres event. He won a Bronze medal at the 2020 Summer Paralympics.

Biography

Peacock was born in Cambridge, and grew up in the village of Shepreth. At age 5, he contracted meningitis, resulting in the disease killing the tissues in his right leg, which was then amputated just below the knee. Wanting to play football, he was directed to a Paralympic sports talent day when he asked about disability sport in the hospital that fitted his prosthetic leg. His mother would carry him to school when his very short stump was too sore to wear his prosthetic leg. Peacock refers to his stump as his "sausage leg."

Peacock ran his first international race at the Paralympic World Cup in Manchester in May 2012. In June 2012 Peacock set a new 100 metres world record in amputee sprinting at the United States Paralympic track and field trials, recording a time of 10.85 seconds to beat the previous record held by Marlon Shirley by 0.06 seconds. This record was beaten in July 2013 at the 2013 IPC Athletics World Championships at the Stade du Rhône in Lyon when American athlete Richard Browne recorded a time of 10.83 in the T44 100m semi-finals.

At the 2012 Summer Paralympics, Peacock won the 100m T44 final with a time of 10.90 seconds, claiming the gold and the Paralympic record in the process. The win made his coach, Dan Pfaff, the only man to have coached 100m gold medalists in both the Olympics and the Paralympics; Pfaff coached Canada's Donovan Bailey, the gold medalist in the 1996 Summer Olympics in Atlanta.

Peacock pulled out of the 2015 IPC Athletics World Championships due to a sore on his stump that developed over the summer.

At the 2016 Summer Paralympics, Peacock defended his title, winning gold in the T44 100m, in 10.81 seconds.

From September 2017 Peacock was a contestant on series 15 of the BBC One programme Strictly Come Dancing, becoming the first amputee paralympian to compete on the show. Partnered with Oti Mabuse, they were the eighth couple to be eliminated, at the show in Blackpool.

Peacock appeared on the 15th Series of Who Do You Think You Are?, which aired in 2018.

Peacock was a late addition to the British team for the postponed 2020 Summer Paralympics in Tokyo on 21 July 2021. The other additions were David Weir, Kadeena Cox and Libby Clegg. He was part of the team to win silver in the Mixed 4 x 100m relay, also winning an individual bronze in the men's 100m T64. He shared the medal with Johannes Floors, after the pair finished in exactly the same time.

In August 2021, Peacock made a guest appearance in the Channel 4 soap opera Hollyoaks. His scenes involved comforting character Sid Sumner (Billy Price) on insecurities about his recent amputation.

His television series Jonnie's Blade Camp  was screened on Channel 4 in August 2021.

Peacock took part in the Taskmaster 'New Year Treat II', although he was absent from the studio segments due to illness.

Personal life
Peacock's long-term girlfriend is fellow paralympian Sally Brown, from Northern Ireland.

Honours
Peacock was appointed Member of the Order of the British Empire (MBE) in the 2013 New Year Honours for services to athletics.

References

External links 
 
 

1993 births
Living people
English male sprinters
English amputees
Sprinters with limb difference
Paralympic athletes of Great Britain
Paralympic gold medalists for Great Britain
Athletes (track and field) at the 2012 Summer Paralympics
Athletes (track and field) at the 2016 Summer Paralympics
Medalists at the 2012 Summer Paralympics
Medalists at the 2016 Summer Paralympics
Medalists at the 2020 Summer Paralympics
World record holders in Paralympic athletics
Members of the Order of the British Empire
Sportspeople from Cambridge
People from Shepreth
Paralympic medalists in athletics (track and field)
Athletes (track and field) at the 2020 Summer Paralympics
Television presenters with disabilities